Daniel Gimeno-Traver was the defending champion but chose not to compete.
Marsel İlhan defeated Pere Riba 6–0, 7–6(7–4) in the final. Due to rain this match was played on Monday, 20 September 2010 at 11:00 local time.

Seeds

Draw

Finals

Top half

Bottom half

References
Main Draw
Qualifying Singles

Banja Luka Challenger - Singles
2010 Singles